McGowan Peak (variant name McGown Peak), at  above sea level is a peak in the Sawtooth Range of Idaho. The peak is located in the Sawtooth Wilderness of Sawtooth National Recreation Area in Custer County. McGowan Peak rises above the southwest end of Stanley Lake.

References 

Mountains of Custer County, Idaho
Mountains of Idaho
Sawtooth Wilderness